Bang! is an album by the Canadian musician Corey Hart, released in 1990. It was his last album to chart in the U.S., reaching No. 134, and generated one hit single, "A Little Love", which reached No. 37. Hart supported the album with a North American tour.

Production
The album was recorded in California. The track "Ballade for Nien Cheng" was inspired by Cheng's memoir Life and Death in Shanghai. "Chase the Sun" is a re-recorded version of a track from Hart's previous album, Young Man Running. Kenny Aronoff played drums.

Critical reception

The Toronto Star wrote that Hart's voice "is a martyr's bleat that strains for soulfulness but ends up suggesting something closer to discomfort." The Orlando Sentinel noted Hart's "continuing bid to prove Canadian MOR can be just as middle-of-the-road as American MOR."

Track listing 
All songs written by Corey Hart.

 "A Little Love" 4:09
 "Bang! (Starting Over)" 3:48
 "Rain On Me" 4:38
 "Chase the Sun" 3:15
 "Diamond Cowboy" 4:32
 "Icon" 3:52
 "Can't Stand Losin' You" 4:30
 "Kisses on the Train" 4:15
 "Art of Color" 4:17
 "Slowburn" 2:50
 "Ballade for Nien Cheng" 2:51

Production 
 Corey Hart – producer
 Greg Edward – producer, recording, mixing 
 Matt D'Arbanlay-Butler – engineer 
 Jeff Poe – assistant engineer 
 Andy Udoff – assistant engineer
 Toby Wright – assistant engineer
 Bob Ludwig – mastering at Masterdisk (New York City, New York).
 Julia Eisenthal – album coordinator 
 Henry Marquez – art direction 
 Erika Gagnon – art direction, design 
 Dewey Nicks – photography

Personnel 
 Corey Hart – lead and backing vocals, keyboards, acoustic piano 
 Charles Judge – keyboards 
 Randy Kerber – additional keyboards 
 Michael Landau – guitars
 Michael Hehir – additional guitars
 John Pierce – bass 
 Kenny Aronoff – drums, percussion, additional backing vocals (1)
 Gerald Albright – saxophones 
 Jimmy Z. – harmonica
 Doug Cameron – violin (7)
 Greg Edward – additional backing vocals (1)
 Ruby Turner – backing vocals

References 

Corey Hart (singer) albums
1990 albums
EMI Records albums